Harnam Singh Grewal (高禮和) CBE ED (born December 5, 1937 in Hong Kong) is a former Hong Kong hockey player and career civil servant. He grew up and lived most of his life in Hong Kong. Upon completion of his University education, he returned to serve in the Government of Hong Kong. The last post he held was Secretary for the Civil Service. He retired to Canada in the 1990s.

Heritage
Grewal's family originates from Punjab, India.

Early days
Grewal was born in Hong Kong, but spent most of his childhood in his ancestral village of Ballowal in Ludhiana District, Punjab. He attended primary school in the village, and when the family returned to Hong Kong in 1947, continued his schooling at Sir Ellis Kadoorie School and then King's College. He is an avid field hockey fan, and in his younger days represented Hong Kong as a player at the international level, with the high points being the Asian Games in Djakarta (1962) and Bangkok (1966) and the Olympic Games in Tokyo (1964). He was an active member of the Royal Hong Kong Regiment (The Volunteers) from 1963 to 1984 when he retired with the rank of Major. He was appointed Honorary Colonel of the Regiment in 1987 and served in that capacity until 1990.

Education
He attended primary school at the Sir Ellis Kadoorie School, Hong Kong, in the late 1940s. He then went to King's College, Hong Kong for his secondary schooling before entering the University of Hong Kong in 1956. He graduated with a B.A. (Hons.) in English from there in 1959, and completed a Diploma in Education the following year. He then went on to England to study at the University of Cambridge for two years before returning to Hong Kong in 1962.

Career with the Hong Kong government
He initially taught at Queen's College in Hong Kong, from 1962 to 1964. When the Government was recruiting Administrative Officers for the 1964 intake, he applied and was taken on. He served in various posts over the years, including that of District Officer Taipo (1970 - 1973), Deputy Director of Urban Services (New Territories) (1976 -1980), and Deputy Secretary for the Civil Service (1980 - 1984). He was appointed Commissioner of Customs and Excise in 1984, followed by his appointment as Secretary for Transport in 1986. He took on the portfolio of the Secretary for the Civil Service in early 1987 and held that position for just under three years. He retired as Secretary for the Civil Service in 1990.

Olympian
Grewal was an Olympic field hockey player for Hong Kong during the 1964 Summer Olympics.

Retirement
 He retired to Canada at the end of 1990.

References

External links
 
Harnam Singh Grewal @ Sports-Reference

Hong Kong civil servants
Grewal, Harnam Singh
1937 births
Living people
Hong Kong male field hockey players
Alumni of King's College, Hong Kong
Alumni of the University of Cambridge
Olympic field hockey players of Hong Kong
Field hockey players at the 1964 Summer Olympics
Hong Kong people of Indian descent
Hong Kong people of Punjabi descent
Canadian people of Indian descent
Canadian people of Punjabi descent
Hong Kong emigrants to Canada
Asian Games competitors for Hong Kong
Field hockey players at the 1962 Asian Games
Field hockey players at the 1966 Asian Games